Bade Dilwala is a 1999 Indian Hindi-language romance film produced and directed by Shakeel Noorani. The film is a remake of the 1994 Hollywood movie It Could Happen to You. It stars Sunil Shetty and Priya Gill in pivotal roles. It is unrelated to the 1983-released Bollywood film of the same name.

Plot
Police inspector Ram (Sunil Shetty) is a man of his word. His wife Manthara (Archana Puran Singh) is obsessed with money and neglects her family in pursuit of getting rich quick. She forces Ram to buy a lottery ticket and he obliges. When he goes into a restaurant for a snack, he finds that he has no money to tip the waitress Piya (Priya Gill). He promises her half the money if he ever wins the lottery. And to his surprise, he does! But Manthara is not about to give up half of this windfall so easily and as Ram and Piya come closer to each other, they discover a growing attraction.

Cast
 Sunil Shetty as Police Inspector Ram Prasad
 Priya Gill as Piya Verma
 Paresh Rawal as Mannubhai Rajnikant Shroff
 Archana Puran Singh as Manthara, Ram's wife
 Satish Kaushik as Police Inspector Iqbal Shaikh
 Ranjeet as Prosecuting Attorney
 Raju Srivastava as Actor
 Rashid Khan as Sanju Baba
 Guddi Maruti as Zarine
 Raju Kher as Motilal Bihari

Soundtrack

References

External links

1990s Hindi-language films
1999 films
Films scored by Aadesh Shrivastava
Indian remakes of American films
Hindi films remade in other languages